Ginetti is an Italian surname.

List of people with the surname 

 Giovanni Francesco Ginetti (1626–1691), Italian bishop
 Marzio Ginetti (1585–1671), Italian cardinal
 Nadia Ginetti (born 1969), Italian politician

See also 

 Ginette (disambiguation)

Surnames
Surnames of Italian origin
Italian-language surnames